Cloverdale Township is one of thirteen townships in Putnam County, Indiana. As of the 2010 census, its population was 3,929 and it contained 1,713 housing units.

Cloverdale Township was organized in 1846.

Geography

Cities and towns
 Cloverdale (partial)

References

External links
 Indiana Township Association
 United Township Association of Indiana

Townships in Putnam County, Indiana
Townships in Indiana